Natural Forces is an album by Lyle Lovett, released in 2009 (see 2009 in music).
All twelve songs, including the five written or co-written by Lovett, are written by songwriters from Texas.

Track listing 
 "Natural Forces" (Lyle Lovett) – 5:40
 "Farmer Brown/Chicken Reel" (Lovett, Traditional) – 4:03
 "Pantry" (Lovett, April Kimble) – 4:08
 "Empty Blue Shoes" (Lovett) – 2:58
 "Whooping Crane" (Eric Taylor) – 4:50
 "Bayou Song" (Don Sanders) – 4:05
 "Bohemia" (Tommy Elskes) – 3:18
 "Don't You Think I Feel It Too" (David Ball) – 3:48
 "Sun and Moon and Stars" (Vince Bell) – 4:33
 "Loretta" (Townes Van Zandt) – 3:38
 "It's Rock and Roll" (Lovett, Robert Earl Keen) – 4:30
 "Pantry" [Acoustic Version] (Lovett, Kimble) – 4:03

Chart performance

References

2009 albums
Lyle Lovett albums
Lost Highway Records albums